Robert Byrne, C.O. (born 22 September 1956) is a prelate of the Catholic Church in England. He was the 14th Bishop of Hexham and Newcastle from 2019 to 2022. He previously served as an auxiliary bishop of the Archdiocese of Birmingham and the titular bishop of Cuncacestre. He is the first Oratorian to be appointed a bishop in England since 1874.

Biography

Early life 
Byrne was born on 22 September 1956 in Manchester, England. He was educated at St Bede's College, Manchester, a private Catholic school. He studied at King's College, London and at the Pontifical University of Saint Thomas Aquinas in Rome.

Priesthood and Religious Life 
Byrne entered the Birmingham Oratory in 1980. On 5 January 1985, he was ordained to the priesthood by Maurice Couve de Murville, the then Archbishop of Birmingham. In 1990, he moved to Oxford where he founded the Oxford Oratory. From 1990 to 1999, he was Parish Priest of the Parish of St Aloysius, Oxford. From 1993 to 2011, he served as the elected Provost of Oxford Oratory.

Auxiliary Bishop of Birmingham
In March 2014, Pope Francis appointed him an auxiliary bishop of Archdiocese of Birmingham. As such, he became the first Oratorian to be appointed a bishop in England since 1874 when Edward Bagshawe was appointed Bishop of Nottingham. On 13 May 2014, he was consecrated to the episcopate as the Titular Bishop of Cuncacestre. The principal consecrator was Bernard Longley, the Archbishop of Birmingham, and the co-consecrators were Michael C. Barber SJ, the bishop of Oakland, and Philip Pargeter, his predecessor as Auxiliary Bishop of Birmingham. His pastoral area within the Archdiocese of Birmingham covers six deaneries: Birmingham Cathedral, Birmingham North, Birmingham South, Birmingham East, Kidderminster, and Worcester.

Bishop of Hexham and Newcastle 
On 4 February 2019, Pope Francis appointed Byrne the next Bishop of Hexham and Newcastle, in succession to Séamus Cunningham. He was enthroned as the 14th bishop of the Diocese of Hexham and Newcastle during a Mass at St Mary's Cathedral, Newcastle on 25 March 2019.

On 12 December 2022, Pope Francis accepted his resignation from his bishopric, nine years before the normal retirement age of 75, as mandated by Catholic canon law. In a statement, the bishop said that the duties of his office had "become too great a burden to bear".

It was reported on Sunday, 22 January 2023, that the Vatican was investigating rumours of a sex party at St Mary's Cathedral. As part of the investigation into the resignation of Byrne, the Church was looking into claims one of his priests invited worshippers to a party in his quarters attached to the cathedral during lockdown. The priest, Michael McCoy, dean of the cathedral, killed himself four days after finding out he was being investigated by police for child sexual abuse. In a letter seen by The Sunday Times Malcolm McMahon, archbishop of Liverpool, who is leading the investigation into the circumstances surrounding Byrne's resignation, said he has been asked by the pope’s advisers to prepare “an in-depth report into the events leading up to Bishop Byrne’s resignation”.

See also
 Catholic Church in England

References

Oratorian bishops
1956 births
Living people
21st-century Roman Catholic bishops in England
People educated at St Bede's College, Manchester
Alumni of King's College London
Pontifical University of Saint Thomas Aquinas alumni
Roman Catholic bishops of Hexham and Newcastle
English Roman Catholic bishops